Neko Jump was a pop duo band in Thailand, composed of twin sisters Warattha "Noey (Thai: เนย)" (Thai: วรัฐฐา) and Charattha "Jam (Thai: แจม)" (Thai: ชรัฐฐา) Imraporn (Thai: อิมราพร).

History 
The twins were born on December 10, 1989. Noey is two minutes older than Jam. Their younger sister is named Piglet, who belongs to the Thai girl group Sugar Eyes. When Noey and Jam were in primary school, they took singing and dancing classes and impressed their teachers. They joined contests and practiced singing and acting.

Some of their songs in 2006-2010 were distributed in Japan by King Records with Thai versions included. One song was used as the opening and ending in the anime Anyamaru Tantei Kiruminzuu in the Thai and Japanese version. In 2009, Jam joined the project girl group Seven Days that consisted of female artists, such as Waii, signed under the Kamikaze label. In June 2012, it was announced that the project group would be revived to feature a new line-up including Noey alone instead. The new line-up debuted with the song "Angry Boo".

From 2015 to 2017, the twins did not work together at all, due to contract restrictions. Their contract expired on July 28, 2017, freeing them of its restrictions.

Then in 2018, the twins comeback with their younger sister named Piglet and re-debut again in sub-unit named JNP with Bad Pillow single.

Education 
Noey and Jam studied for a bachelor's degree at the Faculty of Fine Arts, and then took two years of Communication Arts at Stamford International and University of Oxford.

Recognition 
Noey won first place in a Disney Singing Contest, singing 'Colors of The Wind', while Jam came in second place.
Jam won first place in the Royal Trophy Singing Contest, singing a song written by the King of Thailand.
They won first place in the Exit B-Boy and 12-Plus G-Girl Contest 2005 by dancing and singing songs, including 'All That Jazz'.
Noey and Jam were the last semi-finalists in the KPN Awards singing contest.

Dramas 
Doot Tawan Dang Pupah (2012) - Jam
Wiwa Paa Cha Taek (2013) - Jam
Autumn In My Heart (2013) - Jam
Ching Rak Hak Sawat (2014) - Jam
ลิขิตฟ้ากั้นรัก (2014) - Jam
วิมานซาตาน (2014) - Noey
หัวใจลัดพ่วง (2014) - Noey

Series

Sitcoms

Movies 
Saranae-Osekai (2012) - Both

Albums 
 2006: Neko Jump
 Poo
 Sarang hae yoe (chun ruk ter)
 My gallery
 Chuay mud nhoi
 khao jah ngao mhai
2007: Joob Joob
 Joob joob
 Puen nah jor
 E des kah
 Khao jah pai jeeb krai eak mhai
 Khern khern
 2008: Lady Ready!
 Oak huk kaa
 Kawaii Boy
 Chi mi
 Yark took ter kid tueng
 Yah yood na
 Happy Hurtday
 Luer
 Wun haeng kwam ruk
 Nai tua rai ka yai jai noi
 Nueng kum tee geb wai
 2010: Secret of Virgin
 Harm Naun Khon Diew
 Mi khey thuk rak ley
 Message
 Ruk Mi Me Chao Khong
 Kair Tur Bung Kub
 Kair Ngao Ya Cao Chi Pid
 Ruk Kor Di
 Pueng Ruk Tur
 2012: Ahhh!
 Mai Tod Chi (Girls On Top)
 Mai Ruk Chum Dai
 Na Ta Dee Mai Mee Fan

References

Thai pop music groups
Identical twin females
1989 births
Living people
Thai twins
Musical groups established in 2006
Musical groups from Bangkok
Twin musical duos
Thai musical duos
Female musical duos
Japanese-language singers of Thailand